Diego Carrasco (born in 1954 in Jerez de la Frontera, Spain) is a Spanish flamenco guitar player, composer and singer (cantaor).

Biography 

He started at the age of 13 years old as "Tate de Jerez", playing guitar to artists like Ana la Piriñaca, tío Gregorio Borrico, Terremoto de Jerez, Manolo Soler or Sernita de Jerez; and to dancers like Alejandro Vega y Antonio Gades.

In 1984 his first album as singer is recorded, and he start a personal way to understand flamenco fusion with other musics.

Albums 

 Cantes y sueños (RCA, 1984)
 Tomaquetoma (RCA, 1987)
 Voz de referencia (Nuevos Medios, 1993)
 A tiempo (Nuevos Medios, 1994)
 Inquilino del Mundo (Nuevos Medios, 2000)
 Mi ADN flamenco (Nuevos Medios, 2004)
 Hippytano (2012)
 No marrecojo (2017)

References

External links

 Official blog

1954 births
Living people
People from Jerez de la Frontera
Flamenco singers
Singers from Andalusia
Spanish male singers
Romani singers
Spanish Romani people
Romani guitarists
Romani musicians